Pupilla is a genus of minute air-breathing land snails, terrestrial pulmonate gastropod mollusks or micromollusks in the subfamily Pupillinae of the family Pupillidae. 

Shells of Pupilla species are known from terrestrial Cenozoic strata dating back to the Oligocene until the Holocene period.

Distribution 
This genus occurs in Eurasia, northern Africa and North America.

Species
Species within the genus Pupilla include:

 † Pupilla aeoli (Hilber, 1884) 
 Pupilla afghanicum Solem, 1979
 Pupilla alabiella Schileyko, 1984
 Pupilla alaskensis Nekola & Coles, 2014
 † Pupilla almuhambetovae Prysjazhnjuk, 2017 
 Pupilla alpicola (Charpentier, 1837)
 Pupilla annandalei Pilsbry
 Pupilla anzobica Izzatullaev, 1970
 Pupilla armeniaca (Issel, 1865)
 † Pupilla bargi Prysiazhniuk, 2017 
 † Pupilla belokrysi Steklov, 1966 
 Pupilla bigranata (Rossmässler 1839) (taxon inquirendum)
 Pupilla bipatulata Akramowski, 1943
 † Pupilla bituberculata H.-J. Wang & S.-Y. Guo, 1991 
 † Pupilla blainvilleana (Dupuy, 1850) 
 Pupilla blandii E. S. Morse, 1865 - Rocky Mountain column
 † Pupilla bogdanovkaense Prysiazhniuk, 2017 
 Pupilla brevicostis (Benson, 1849)
 Pupilla calacharicus (Boettger, 1886) 
 † Pupilla capitani (de Morgan, 1920) 
 † Pupilla crossei (Michaud, 1862) 
 † Pupilla cupella O. Boettger, 1889 
 † Pupilla diezi (Flach, 1890) 
 Pupilla diopsis (Benson, 1863)
 Pupilla duplicata (Preston, 1911)
 Pupilla ficulnea (Tate, 1894)
 Pupilla gallae Tzvetkov, 1940
 Pupilla goniodon Pilsbry, 1927
 Pupilla guadalupensis Pilsbry, 1927
 Pupilla gutta (Benson, 1864)
 Pupilla hebes (Ancey 1881) - crestless column
 Pupilla hokkaidoensis Nekola, Coles & S. Chiba, 2014
 Pupilla hudsoniana Nekola & Coles, 2014
 Pupilla iheringi Suter, 1900
 † Pupilla impressa (F. Sandberger, 1862) 
 Pupilla inequidenta Schileyko & Almuhambetova, 1979
 † Pupilla inermis Russell, 1931 
 Pupilla inops (Reinhardt, 1877)
 † Pupilla iratiana (Dupuy, 1850) 
 Pupilla khunjerabica Pokryszko, Auffenberg, Hlaváč & Naggs, 2009
 Pupilla kyrostriata Walther & Hausdorf, 2014
 Pupilla limata Schileyko, 1984
 Pupilla loessica Ložek, 1954
 † Pupilla michaudi Wenz, 1919 
 † Pupilla mlomnickii (Friedberg, 1905) 
 Pupilla muscorum (Linnaeus, 1758) - widespread column - type species
 † Pupilla mutabilis Steklov, 1966 
 Pupilla obliquicosta Smith, 1892 - extinct
 Pupilla paraturcmenica Pokryszko, Auffenberg, Hlaváč & Naggs, 2009
 † Pupilla parvula (Deshayes, 1863) 
 † Pupilla perlabiata Gottschick & Wenz, 1919 
 † Pupilla poltavica O. Boettger, 1889 
 Pupilla profundotuberculata H.-J. Wang & S.-Y. Guo, 1991 
 Pupilla pupula
 Pupilla quxuensis D.-N. Chen & G.-Q. Zhang, 2001
 † Pupilla retusa (F. Sandberger, 1858) 
 † Pupilla roberti Prysiazhniuk, 2017 
 Pupilla salemensis (W. T. Blanford & H. F. Blanford, 1861)
 Pupilla satparanica Pokryszko, Auffenberg, Hlaváč & Naggs, 2009
 † Pupilla selecta (Thomä, 1845) 
 † Pupilla selectiformis (Simionescu & Barbu, 1940) 
 Pupilla seriola (Benson, 1861)
 † Pupilla shantungensis Yen, 1969 
 Pupilla simplexa Y.-T. Li, 1985 
 Pupilla sonorana (Sterki, 1899) - three-tooth column
 † Pupilla staszicii (Łomnicki, 1886) 
 † Pupilla steinheimensis (K. Miller, 1900) 
 Pupilla sterkiana (Pilsbry, 1890)
 Pupilla sterrii (Forster & Voith, 1840)
 Pupilla striopolita Schileyko, 1984
 † Pupilla subquadridens (A. d'Orbigny, 1852) 
 Pupilla syngenes (Pilsbry, 1890) - top-heavy column
 Pupilla tetrodus (Boettger, 1870)
 Pupilla triplicata (Studer, 1820)
 † Pupilla triplicatoidea Steklov, 1966 
 † Pupilla tschumakovi Prysjazhnjuk, 2017 
 Pupilla turcmenica (O. Boettger)
 † Pupilla zeisslerae Schlickum, 1975 
 Pupilla ziaratana Pokryszko, Auffenberg, Hlaváč & Naggs, 2009

Synonyms
 Pupilla barrackporensis Gude, 1914: synonym of Insulipupa malayana (Issel, 1874) (junior synonym)
 Pupilla cinghalensis Gude, 1914: synonym of Indopupa cinghalensis (Gude, 1914) (original combination)
 Pupilla cryptodon (Heude, 1880): synonym of Gibbulinopsis cryptodon (Heude, 1880) (unaccepted combination)
 Pupilla cupa (Jan, 1832): synonym of Pupilla muscorum (Linnaeus, 1758) (junior synonym)
 Pupilla draparnaudi Leach [in Turton], 1831: synonym of Lauria cylindracea (Da Costa, 1778)
 Pupilla floridana Dall, 1885: synonym of Gastrocopta pentodon (Say, 1822) (junior synonym)
 Pupilla fontana (Krauss, 1848): synonym of Gibbulinopsis fontana (F. Krauss, 1848) (superseded combination)
 Pupilla gracilis Izzatullaev, 1970: synonym of Gibbulinopsis gracilis (Izzatullaev, 1970) (original combination)
 Pupilla hudsonianum [sic]: synonym of Pupilla hudsoniana Nekola & Coles, 2014 (wrong gender agreement of specific epithet)
 Pupilla muscerda (Benson, 1853): synonym of Microstele muscerda (Benson, 1853) (unaccepted combination)
 Pupilla pratensis (Clessin, 1871): synonym of Pupilla alpicola (Charpentier, 1837) (unaccepted > junior subjective synonym)
 † Pupilla quadrigranata (F. Sandberger, 1858): synonym of † Pupilla selecta (Thomä, 1845)  (junior synonym)
 Pupilla reibischi Dall & Ochsner, 1928: synonym of Gastrocopta reibischi (Dall & Ochsner, 1928) (original name)
 Pupilla salmensis (W. T. Blanford & H. F. Blanford, 1861): synonym of Pupilla salemensis (W. T. Blanford & H. F. Blanford, 1861) (misspelling of original name.)
 Pupilla signata (Mousson, 1873): synonym of Gibbulinopsis signata (Mousson, 1873)
 Pupilla stoneri Chamberlin & Jones, 1929: synonym of Gastrocopta pilsbryana (Sterki, 1890)
 † Pupilla submuscorum Gottschick & Wenz, 1919: synonym of † Gibbulinopsis submuscorum (Gottschick & Wenz, 1919)
 Pupilla wolfae Tzvetkov, 1940: synonym of Pupilla sterrii (Voith, 1840) (junior synonym)

References

 Flach, K. (1890). Palaeontologische Beiträge. Verhandlungen der Physikalisch-Medicinischen Gesellschaft zu Würzburg, Neue Folge. 24(3): 49-59, pl. 1.
 Schileyko, A. A. (1984). Nazemnye molljuski podotrjada Pupillina fauny SSSR (Gastropoda, Pulmonata, Geophila). In:. Fauna SSSR, Molljuski. III, 3
 Held, F. (1837-1838). Notizen über die Weichthiere Bayerns. Isis (Oken), 30 (4): 303-309 (1837); 30 (12): 901-919 (1838). Leipzig

External links
 Draparnaud, J. P. R. (1801). Tableau des mollusques terrestres et fluviatiles de la France. Montpellier / Paris (Renaud / Bossange, Masson & Besson). 1-116
 Pilsbry, H. A. (1920-1921). Manual of conchology, structural and systematic, with illustrations of the species. Ser. 2, Pulmonata. Vol. 26: Pupillidae (Vertigininae, Pupillinae). pp i-iv, 1-254, pls 1-24. Philadelphia, published by the Conchological Section, Academy of Natural Sciences
 Held, F. (1837-1838). Notizen über die Weichthiere Bayerns. Isis (Oken), 30 (4): 303-309 (1837); 30 (12): 901-919 (1838). Leipzig
 Dall, W. H. (1904). Notes on the nomenclature of the Pupacea and associated forms. The Nautilus. 17(10): 114-116
  Cockerell, T. D. A. (1905). Note on the nomenclature of the snails usually called Pupa. The Nautilus. 18(9): 103-105

Pupillidae